AC7 or AC-7 may refer to:

 Aviastroitel AC-7, a Russian glider
 Aviastroitel AC-7M, a Russian motorglider
 Southern Pacific class AC-7, a class of steam locomotives
 USS Hector (AC-7), a U.S. Navy refueling ship
 AC-7, an IEC Utilization Category
Ace Combat 7: Skies Unknown, a  combat flight action video game